Jon Kwang-ik (born 5 April 1988) is a North Korean professional footballer who currently plays as a defender for Amrokgang in the DPR Korea League.

Jon has appeared for the Korea DPR national football team in the 2010 FIFA World Cup qualifying rounds, 2011 Asian Cup, and the 2012 AFC Challenge Cup. At a youth level, he also played at the 2005 FIFA U-17 World Championship and the 2007 FIFA U-20 World Cup.

Goals for Senior National Team
Scores and results list North Korea's goal tally first.

References

External links

Jon Kwang-ik at DPRKFootball

1988 births
Living people
North Korean footballers
Association football defenders
North Korea international footballers
Amnokgang Sports Club players
2011 AFC Asian Cup players
2015 AFC Asian Cup players
North Korean expatriate footballers
Footballers at the 2010 Asian Games
Asian Games competitors for North Korea